Adnan Osmanović (born 20 March 1997) is a Bosnian professional footballer who plays as a centre-forward for Bosnian Premier League club Olimpik.

Honours
Olimpik
First League of FBiH: 2019–20

References

External links
Adnan Osmanović at Sofascore

1997 births
Living people
Footballers from Nuremberg
Bosnia and Herzegovina footballers
Bosnia and Herzegovina youth international footballers
Bosnia and Herzegovina under-21 international footballers
Premier League of Bosnia and Herzegovina players
First League of the Federation of Bosnia and Herzegovina players
FK Sarajevo players
FK Olimpik players
FK Sloboda Tuzla players
Association football forwards